"Manos Vacías" (Eng.: Empty Handed) is a song written by Emilio Cid Climent and Luis Bolín Domecq. As performed by Spanish singers Miguel Bosé and Rafa Sánchez, it was included on Bosé's studio album Los Chicos No Lloran in 1990 and later included on the special edition of his album Papito. It was also sang by Raoul Vázquez and Agoney Hernández in the talent show Operación Triunfo in 2017.

References

1990 songs
Male vocal duets
Spanish songs
Miguel Bosé songs